Shekou West was a freight station in Nanshan District in Shenzhen. It was located near Chiwan station of the Shenzhen Metro. The branch line from Shenzhen West railway station to Shekou was dismantled in 2016, along with the line from Shenzhen West to Mawan.

References

Railway stations in Guangdong
Railway stations closed in 2016